Romance Revisited: The Love Songs of Jose Mari Chan is the fourth studio album by Filipino singer Christian Bautista, released in the Philippines on August 20, 2009, by Universal Records. The album consists of nineteen Jose Mari Chan-originals, including duets with Sarah Geronimo, Regine Velasquez, Lani Misalucha and Chan himself. It includes a limited edition 2010 photo calendar of Bautista. "Tell Me Your Name", Beautiful Girl", "Please Be Careful with My Heart", "Afraid for Love to Fade" and "I Remember the Girl" were released as singles.

To date, the album has been certified quadruple platinum by the Philippine Association of the Record Industry, selling 80, 000 units in the Philippines and double platinum by the Recording Industry of Indonesia. It has sold over 250,000 units in Asia.

Track listing
All tracks were produced by Ito Rapadas.

Personnel
Credits were taken from Titik Pilipino.

 Alkemi Productions - arranger
 Christian Bautista - lead vocals, back-up vocals
 Jose Mari Chan - lead vocals (track 19)
 Nelson Cruz - hair stylist
 Dorothy Descalsota - back-up vocals
 Kathleen Dy-Go - executive producer
 Gian Espiritu - make-up
 Fred Garcia - arranger
 Sarah Geronimo - lead vocals (track 5)
 Gil Lozenada - recording
 Lani Misalucha - lead vocals (track 13)
 Mark Nicdao - photography
 Jay Saturnino D. Lumboy - album design and layout
 Ito Rapadas - producer, back-up vocals, back-up vocals arrangement, arranger
 Alan Smallwood - arranger
 Liz Uy - stylist
 Bobby Velasco - arranger
 Regine Velasquez - lead vocals (track 6)
 Willy Villa - recording, mixing, digital mastering
 Mixed and digitally mastered at U.R. Recording Studio

Certifications

References

Christian Bautista albums
2009 albums